Canciones andaluzas para 2 guitarras (Andalusian Songs for 2 Guitars) is the first of four collaboration albums by Paco de Lucía and Ramón de Algeciras.

Track listing

Guajira "Que viene el coco" – 2:47
Bulería "La Zarzamora" – 2:18
Tientos "Canción del río” – 3:20
Fandangos de Huelva "Al Conquero" – 2:28
Jaleo "Los piconeros" – 2:35
Bulería "Roja de celos" – 3:00
Tanguillo "Pepa Banderas" – 2:27
Rumba "El Inclusero" – 3:06
Farruca "Limosna de amores" – 2:40
Bulería "Romance gitano" – 2:55
Bulería "Te lo juro yo" – 2:36
Sevillanas "Abril en Sevilla" – 2:43

Musicians
Paco de Lucía – Flamenco guitar
Ramón de Algeciras – Flamenco guitar
Antonio Valdepeñas – Zapateado
Antoñita Imperio – Palillos
Pilar La Cubanita – Palmas

References
 Gamboa, Manuel José and Nuñez, Faustino. (2003). Paco de Lucía. Madrid:Universal Music Spain.

1967 albums
Paco de Lucía albums
Universal Music Spain albums
Instrumental albums
Collaborative albums